The 1971 Georgia Tech Yellow Jackets football team represented the Georgia Institute of Technology in the 1971 NCAA University Division football season. The Yellow Jackets were led by fifth-year head coach Bud Carson and played their home games at Grant Field in Atlanta.  They were invited to the 1971 Peach Bowl, held just 3 miles from their home stadium in Atlanta, where they lost to Ole Miss, 18–41. After the season, Bud Carson was fired as head coach after compiling a 27–27 record over five seasons.

Schedule

Sources:

Roster

References

Georgia Tech
Georgia Tech Yellow Jackets football seasons
Georgia Tech Yellow Jackets football